Noshirvan Nagarwala (10 October 1909 – 10 September 1998) was an Indian cricket umpire. He stood in five Test matches between 1952 and 1960.

In the 1930s, Nagarwala appeared in 11 first-class matches as a player, with Maharashtra, Parsees and Dr HD Kanga's Parsees XI.

See also
 List of Test cricket umpires

References

1909 births
1998 deaths
People from Ahmednagar
Indian Test cricket umpires
Indian cricketers
Maharashtra cricketers
Parsees cricketers